Masstige is a marketing term meaning downward brand extension. The word is a portmanteau of the words mass
and prestige and has been described as "prestige for the
masses". Ajay Kumar, Justin Paul and Anandakuttan Unnithan defined masstige marketing as "A marketing strategy which envisages to make brands prestigious while retaining its affordability for the mass consumers, by grounding in product and promotion strategies, and keeping prices relatively high". Michael Silverstein and Neil Fiske introduced the term 'Masstige', Justin Paul developed the concept, introduced a scale to measure it and popularised it in his articles in 2015, 2018 and 2019.

The term was introduced by Michael Silverstein and Neil Fiske in their book Trading Up and Harvard Business Review article "Luxury for the Masses". Masstige products are defined as "premium but attainable", and there are two key tenets: (1) They are considered luxury or premium products and (2) They have price points that fill the gap between mid-market and super premium. 

Silverstein and Fiske cite several examples:

 Bath and Body Works Lotion that sells for  versus .
 Pottery Barn housewares that are considered premium but are widely available at attainable price points well below super premium brands.
 Kendall-Jackson Wines that entered the market at $5 per bottle versus the standard $2 per bottle.
 Porsche Boxster

Several other examples of masstige brand positioning have been proposed by Truon, McColl, and Kitchen include:

 BMW 1 Series for $19,000 vs. traditional BMW sedans for $50,000
 Armani Jeans for $100 vs. Armani Haute Couture for $900
 Tag Heuer Formula 1 for $550 vs. Tag Heuer Link for $4,000
Other brands which are established as masstige brand by research includes:

 iPhone, Louis Vuitton, Gucci

History
According to the Oxford Dictionary Online,  the term originated during the 1990s. It was then popularized in 2003 by Michael Silverstein and Neil Fiske in their book Trading Up and Harvard Business Review article "Luxury for the Masses". Masstige' movement gains steam" by Moly Prior characterizes the product trends for the health and beauty care industries with the term.  Since 2003, the marketing strategy of masstige has been used by numerous consumer goods industries that include premium level products.

Early Research on Masstige 
Michael Silverstein and Neil Fiske's article published in Harvard Business Review in 2003 is the first main frame research article published around masstige. This article has popularised the concept among researchers and enticed others to add to understanding towards masstige. Silverstein and Fiske emphasised on the premium but attainable notion for masstige products. They gave multiple examples including Bath and Body works body lotion, Coach, BMW 325 range, Tiffany, Burberry for masstige brands based on the price these brands were offering. After this article, major break happened when Justin Paul proposed a scale to measure masstige score. Justin Paul gave a ten item scale to measure masstige score and it was called Masstige Mean Score Scale. Justin Paul later in 2018 proposed masstige equation: Price = f(Mass Prestige) and Mass Prestige = f(Promotion, Place, Product/Services). In 2019, Justin Paul gave a theoretical model for masstige marketing. A hexagon model was developed in this research to suggest the measures of creating masstige among consumers.  In 2020, Ajay Kumar, Justin Paul and Anandakuttan Unnithan, came up with a review article which covers the evolution of masstige marketing and proposed the definition of masstige. They also proposed a continuum which positions and differentiates the masstige marketing from other constructs and explains it in terms of price, consumer income, consumption, brands, and markets. This review article discusses all the major research studies carried out on masstige till 2020.

Masstige market positioning
Kitchen, a reasonable equilibrium between perceived prestige and price premium is critical to an effective masstige strategy.  That is to say that masstige brand positioning for the consumer is to develop the brand as a premium, or
reasonable level of perceived prestige yet whose price point is similar to middle-range brands as outlined in the diagram below.

New luxury brands are closer to traditional brands in terms
of prestige, however in terms of price they are closer to middle range brands. Established brands command a premium at 3.1 times more expensive than new luxury brands (masstige positioning), and new luxury brands only sold for 2.2 times more than middle range brands. In terms of perceived prestige, the ratio of traditional luxury brands and new luxury brands was 1.14, while the ratio of new luxury brands and middle-range brands was 1.74. Those brands that employed masstige positioning strategy effectively differentiated themselves from middle range brands in terms of perceived prestige, and yet maintained a reasonable price premium to target middle range customers.

Brand dilution
It has been suggested that luxury marketers thinking about developing their own masstige strategies should be aware of the possibility for brand dilution. To avoid this, it is suggested that adequate price premiums are maintained and access is limited to middle class consumers as brand dilution tends to occur when purchases from middle class consumers becomes frequent or habitual.  The more available a product is the less prestigious its perception.  Luxury marketers should also focus on developing a prestigious environment around the brand by advertising in glamorous magazines and prestigious stores, and holding seasonal fashion shows so that the brand appeals to consumers as an "aspirational" brand.

References

Brand management